Engelhardia hainanensis is a tree native to Hainan Province, China.

hainanensis
Trees of China
Endemic flora of China
Plants described in 1981